Should not be confused with West Rock, another traprock summit in Connecticut

West Peak, of the Hanging Hills, is the highest traprock peak in the state of Connecticut. On a clear day, Mount Tom, in Massachusetts, can be seen 47 miles to the north.

The 62-mile Metacomet Trail crosses West Peak. Activities enjoyed on the peak include hiking, picnicking, and bird watching. West Peak is on an important raptor migration path.

Edwin Howard Armstrong, who invented FM radio and was a network radio pioneer, used West Peak as the location of one of the first FM radio broadcasts, in 1939. His original 70-foot radio mast is still there. Currently, West Peak is home to seven FM broadcast stations, WNPR, WWYZ, WZMX, WDRC-FM, WKSS, WHCN, and WMRQ-FM. It is also known as West Peak State Park.

Geology
West Peak, along with the other Hanging Hills, is part of a mountain chain that is a dormant fault line running through the middle of Connecticut and into Massachusetts.

See also
 The Black Dog of the Hanging Hills
 Metacomet Ridge
 Adjacent summits:

References

 Connecticut Walk Book  17th ed. Connecticut Forest and Park Association.
 This Week in Amateur Radio Cited Dec. 13, 2007

External links
 The City of Meriden

Meriden, Connecticut
Hanging Hills
Mountains of Connecticut
Landforms of New Haven County, Connecticut
Raptor migration sites